Bucculatrix univoca is a moth in the family Bucculatricidae. It was described by Edward Meyrick in 1918. It is found in Japan (Kyushu, Ryukyu), Taiwan and India.

The wingspan is 5-6.5 mm. The forewings are blackish-brown and the hindwings are grey.

The larvae feed on Ipomoea aquatica (syn. I. reptans); Ipomoea indica (syn. I. congesta); and Ipomoea batatas. They mine the leaves of their host plant. The young larvae form a coiled or spiral linear mine.

References

Bucculatricidae
Moths described in 1918
Taxa named by Edward Meyrick
Moths of Asia